Guo Wei (born 31 July 1983) is a Chinese short track speed skater.

At the 2002 Winter Olympics he won a bronze medal in 5000 m relay, together with teammates Feng Kai, Li Jiajun, and Li Ye.

External links
 
 
 
Guo Wei at ISU

1983 births
Living people
Chinese male short track speed skaters
Olympic short track speed skaters of China
Olympic bronze medalists for China
Olympic medalists in short track speed skating
Short track speed skaters at the 2002 Winter Olympics
Medalists at the 2002 Winter Olympics
Asian Games medalists in short track speed skating
Short track speed skaters at the 2003 Asian Winter Games
Medalists at the 2003 Asian Winter Games
Asian Games silver medalists for China
Speed skaters from Changchun
Universiade bronze medalists for China
Universiade medalists in short track speed skating
Competitors at the 1999 Winter Universiade
21st-century Chinese people